HMS Scott is an ocean survey vessel of the Royal Navy, and the only vessel of her class. She is the third Royal Navy ship to carry the name, and the second to be named after the Antarctic explorer, Robert Falcon Scott. She was ordered to replace the survey ship .

Construction
The ship was ordered from BAeSEMA in 1995 to replace the ageing . She was built at the Appledore Shipbuilders in North Devon and launched on 13 October 1996 by Mrs Carolyn Portillo, wife of Michael Portillo, the then-Secretary of State for Defence. She was commissioned on 20 June 1997. Not only is she the largest vessel in the Royal Navy's Hydrographic Squadron, and the fifth largest in the entire fleet, but she is also the largest survey vessel in Western Europe.

Role
Scott is the Royal Navy's only ocean survey vessel. She can remain at sea for up to 300 days a year, thanks to her crew rotation system. Her complement of 78 is divided into three sections: two sections are required to keep the ship operational, with the third on shore on leave or in training. When the ship returns to port, one crew section on board is replaced by the section on shore. The ship can then deploy again almost immediately. As with all of the Royal Navy's large survey vessels, Scott has an auxiliary role in support of mine countermeasure vessels.

Service
The survey, conducted using a high-resolution, multi-beam sonar system, revealed that the earthquake had made a huge impact on the topography of the seabed.

In September 2006, Scott was granted the Freedom of the City of Swansea. From August 2008 until June 2009 she was refitted in Portsmouth.

On 26 October 2009 and again on 25 November 2010 the ship deployed to the South Atlantic and Antarctic to cover for the non-availability of the Royal Navy icebreaker . In February 2010, Scott hosted artist Rowan Huntley for a month in Antarctica, in a new artist-in-residence programme for the Royal Navy inaugurated by the Friends of the Scott Polar Research Institute (SPRI).

In June 2010, the ship visited Cardiff to mark the centenary of Robert Falcon Scott's departure from Cardiff on 15 June 1910 for the South Pole, at the start of the Terra Nova Expedition. In February 2011, Scott hosted Dafila Scott, Scott's granddaughter, in Antarctica for a month as the Friends of the SPRI's second artist-in-residence.

The ship returned to Devonport in April 2011. From November 2013 to June 2014 her most extensive refit to date took place, in Devonport. This included coating the hull with Hempasil X3 non-toxic anti-fouling paint, which is expected to increase her fuel efficiency.

The Ministry of Defence stated in October 2017 that the planned out-of-service date for Scott is 2022. In February 2022, it was indicated that the out of service date would be extended to 2023. In March 2023, and in advance of her decommissioning, the Defence Equipment Sales Authority (DESA) listed HMS Scott as for sale.

Affiliations
42 Engineer Group (Geographic), Royal Engineers
City and County of Swansea
Plymouth Child Development Centre (Scott Hospital, Plymouth)
 TS Scott - Maidstone Sea Cadets
The Captain Scott Society
The Worshipful Company of Water Conservators
Newcastle-under-Lyme School CCF

References

External links

 

Survey vessels of the Royal Navy
Ships built in Devon
1996 ships